Booya or booyah or BOOYAH may refer to:

People
 Abu Mansur Buya, a 10th-century Buyid amir
 Ali ibn Buya, the founder of the 10th century Buyid dynasty in Persia

Music
 Boo-Yaa T.R.I.B.E., a Samoan gangsta rap band

Songs
 "Booyah" (song), a 2013 song by Showtek
 "Booyah, Here We Go", a 1995 song by Sweetbox

Society
 "Boo-yah!", a catchphrase popularized by sportscaster Stuart Scott in the 1990s
 Buya language (disambiguation), several languages
 Buya people, an ethnic group in the Republic of South Sudan

Video gaming
 BOOYAH! Live, a video game live streaming service provided by Garena, from Jan 2020
 Empire of Buya, a region within the Nexus online role-playing game

Other uses
 Booyah (company), a social web and mobile entertainment company
 Booya (ship), a three–masted schooner which sank during Cyclone Tracy in 1974
 Booyah (stew), a simple chicken and vegetable stew

See also
 Hooyah, a battle-cry used by United States Special Forces